No. 131 Helicopter Flight (Airborne Pointers) is a Forward Air Control Helicopter squadron and is equipped with HAL Cheetah and based at Hindon Air Force Station.

History

Assignments

Aircraft
HAL Cheetah

References

131